"Wicked World" is a song by American post-grunge band Cold and the lead single from their fifth studio album, Superfiction. The song was released to radio stations on May 10, 2011.

Music video
The band released the music video for the song directed by Blake Judd.

Track listing

Charts

References

Cold (band) songs
2011 singles
2011 songs
Songs written by Kato Khandwala
Eleven Seven Label Group singles